Shōgun is a 1975 novel by James Clavell. It is the first novel (by internal chronology) of the author's Asian Saga. A major best-seller, by 1990 the book had sold 15 million copies worldwide.

Premise
Beginning in feudal Japan some months before the critical Battle of Sekigahara in 1600, Shōgun gives an account of the rise of the daimyō "Toranaga" (based upon the actual Tokugawa Ieyasu). Toranaga's rise to the shogunate is seen through the eyes of the English sailor John Blackthorne, called Anjin ("Pilot") by the Japanese, whose fictional heroics are loosely based on the historical exploits of William Adams. The book is divided into six sections, preceded by a prologue in which Blackthorne is shipwrecked near Izu, then alternating between locations in Anjiro, Mishima, Osaka, Yedo, and Yokohama.

Plot
John Blackthorne, an English pilot serving on the Dutch warship Erasmus, is the first Englishman to reach Japan. England (and Holland) seek to disrupt Portuguese-Catholic relations with Japan and establish ties of their own through trade and military alliances. 

After Erasmus is blown ashore on the Japanese coast, Blackthorne and ten other survivors are taken captive by local samurai, Kasigi Omi, until his daimyō and uncle, Kasigi Yabu, arrives. Yabu puts Blackthorne and his crew on trial as pirates, using a Jesuit priest to interpret for Blackthorne. Having lost the trial, Blackthorne attacks the Jesuit. His breaking of the priest's
crucifix shows that the priest is his enemy. The Japanese, who know only the Catholic version of Christianity, are shocked. Yabu sentences them all to death.

Omi, a clever adviser, convinces Yabu to spare them to learn more about European ways. After a failed rebellion by the Europeans, Blackthorne agrees to submit to Japanese authority. He is placed in a household, while his crew remain hostages. On Omi's advice, Yabu plans to confiscate the rutters, muskets, cannons, and silver coins recovered from Erasmus. Word reaches Toranaga, Lord of the Kwanto and president of the Council of Regents. Toranaga sends his commander in chief, General Toda "Iron Fist" Hiro-matsu, to take the spoils and crew in order to gain an advantage against Toranaga's main rival on the council, Ishido.

Blackthorne is now called Anjin (navigator or pilot) as the Japanese can't pronounce his real name. Hiro-matsu takes Blackthorne and Yabu back to Osaka. A meeting of the council is taking place at Ishido's castle stronghold. They travel by one of Toranaga's galleys, captained by the Portuguese pilot Rodrigues. Blackthorne and Rodrigues find themselves in a grudging friendship. Rodrigues tries to kill Blackthorne during a storm, but is himself swept overboard. Blackthorne not only saves Rodrigues but safely navigates the ship.

At Osaka, Blackthorne is interviewed by Toranaga, via senior Jesuit priest Martin Alvito, who realizes the threat that Blackthorne presents. A Protestant, Blackthorne tries to turn Toranaga against the Jesuits. Toranaga learns that the Christian faith is divided. Alvito is honor-bound to translate as Blackthorne tells Toranaga his story. The interview ends when Ishido enters, curious about the barbarian Blackthorne.

Toranaga has Blackthorne thrown into prison to keep him from Ishido. Blackthorne is befriended by a Franciscan friar, who reveals further details about the Jesuit conquests and the Portuguese Black Ship, which take the vast profits from the silk trade between China and Japan back to Europe. He is taught some basic Japanese and a little of their culture. Blackthorne is then taken from prison by Ishido's men. Toranaga intervenes and captures Blackthorne from his rival. Ishido loses face.

At their next interview, Toranaga has the Lady Toda Mariko translate. She is a Catholic, torn between her new faith and her loyalty, as a samurai, to Toranaga. Toranaga learns from Blackthorne that Portugal has been granted the right to claim Japan as territory by the Pope, and of the exploitation of both South America and Asia in the name of spreading Catholicism.

At Osaka Castle, Blackthorne is attacked by an assassin from the secretive Amida Tong, a group of operatives who train all their lives to be the perfect weapon for one kill. Toranaga summons Yabu the next day for questioning, since Hiro-matsu says Yabu would be one who would know how to hire them. Yabu's evasive answers adds to Toranaga's distrust of him. The Jesuits may have hired the assassin to kill Blackthorne, to prevent him from revealing any more of what he knows.

The Council of Regents' negotiations go badly and Toranaga is threatened with forced seppuku. To escape the verdict, and to paralyze the council (for procedural reasons), Toranaga resigns. He departs in the guise of his consort, leaving with a train of travelers. Blackthorne  spots the exchange and, when Ishido shows up at the gate of the castle and nearly discovers Toranaga, Blackthorne saves him by creating a diversion. In this way, he gradually gains the trust of Toranaga and enters into his service. Toranaga's party reaches the coast but their ship is blockaded by Ishido's boats. At Blackthorne's suggestion, a Portuguese ship is asked to lend cannon to blast the boats clear. In return, the Jesuits will offer aid in exchange for Blackthorne. Toranaga agrees and the ship clears the coast. The Portuguese pilot, Rodrigues, repays his debt to Blackthorne by having him thrown overboard to swim back to Toranaga's ship. Toranaga's ship escapes by staying alongside the Portuguese ship as both pass through the gap left between the opposing boats. Toranaga and his party return to his ship, which then goes back to Anjiro.

Blackthorne slowly builds up his Japanese-language skills and gains an understanding of the Japanese and their culture, eventually learning to respect it. The Japanese, in turn, are torn over Blackthorne's presence (as he is an outsider and a leader of a disgracefully filthy and uncouth rabble), but also a formidable sailor and navigator with extensive knowledge of the world. As such, he is both beneath contempt and incalculably valuable. A turning point is Blackthorne's attempt at seppuku. The Japanese prevent this attempt (as Blackthorne is worth more alive), but they also come to respect him for his knowledge and attempts to assimilate to their culture. When he also rescues Toranaga in an earthquake, he is granted the status of samurai and hatamoto – a high-status vassal similar to a retainer, with the right of direct audience. As they spend more time together, Blackthorne comes to deeply admire both Toranaga and (specifically) Mariko, and they secretly become lovers.

Eventually, he visits the survivors of his original crew in Yedo, and is astonished at how far he has ventured from the standard 'European' way of life (which he now sees to be filthy, vulgar, and ignorant), and he is actually disgusted by them. Blackthorne's plans to attack the 'Black Ship' are also complicated by his respect and friendship for his Portuguese colleague, Rodrigues, who is now to pilot the vessel. He returns to Osaka by sea with his crew and with 200 samurai (granted to him by Toranaga). Parallel with this plot, the novel also details the intense power struggle between the various war-lords, Toranaga and Ishido, and also – as a subtext – the political manoeuvring of the Protestant and Catholic powers in the Far East. There is also an internal conflict between Christian daimyōs (who are motivated in part by a desire to preserve and expand their (new) religion) and the daimyōs who oppose the Christians, as followers of foreign beliefs and representatives of the 'barbarian' cultural and fiscal influence on their society.

In the novel, Ishido is holding many family members of the other daimyōs as hostages in Osaka, referring to them as "guests". As long as he has these hostages, the other daimyōs, including Toranaga, do not dare attack him. Unforeseen by Toranaga, a replacement regent has also been chosen. Ishido hopes to lure or force Toranaga into the castle and, when all the regents are present, obtain from them an order for Toranaga to commit seppuku. To extricate Toranaga from this situation, Mariko goes to what will be her likely death at Osaka Castle – to face down Ishido and to obtain the hostages' release.

At the castle, Mariko defies Ishido and forces him to either dishonor himself (by admitting to holding the Samurai families as hostages) or to back down and let them leave. When Mariko tries to fulfill Toranaga's orders and to leave the castle, a battle ensues between Ishido's samurai and her escort, until she is forced to return. However, she states that she is disgraced and will commit suicide. As she is about to do so, Ishido gives her the papers to leave the castle on the next day. But that night, a group of ninja that Ishido has hired, aided by Yabu, slips into Toranaga's section of the castle to kidnap Mariko. However, she and Blackthorne and the other ladies of Toranaga's "court", escape into a locked room. As the ninja prepare to blow the door open Mariko stands against the door and is killed by the explosion.

After her cremation, Ishido lets the hostages leave the castle, seriously reducing his control over them. Blackthorne then discovers that his ship has been burned, ruining his chances of attacking the Black Ship and gaining riches and also sailing home to England. However, Mariko has left him some money and Toranaga provides him with men to start building a new ship. Toranaga orders Yabu – who he learns had helped the attack in Osaka with the aim of being on the winning side – to commit seppuku for his treachery. Yabu complies, giving his prized katana to Blackthorne.

The last chapter involves Toranaga as he reveals his inner monologue: that he himself had ordered Blackthorne's ship to be burned, as a way to placate the Christian daimyōs, and to save Blackthorne's life from them, as well as to bring them to his side against Ishido. He then encourages Blackthorne to build another ship. It is Blackthorne's karma to never leave Japan; and Mariko's karma to die for her lord, and for Toranaga to become eventually shogun, with absolute power. In a brief epilogue after the final Battle of Sekigahara, Ishido is captured alive and Toranaga has him buried up to his neck. The novel states that "Ishido lingered three days and died very old".

Characters
Many of the novel's characters have real-life counterparts. 

 John Blackthorne – Miura Anjin (William Adams) (1564–1620)

Yoshi Toranaga – Tokugawa Ieyasu (1543–1616)
Yoshi Sudara – Tokugawa Hidetada (1579–1632)
Yoshi Naga – Matsudaira Tadayoshi (1580–1607)
Ishido – Ishida Mitsunari (1559–1600)
Ochiba – Yodo-dono (1569–1615)
Yaemon – Toyotomi Hideyori (1593–1615)
Onoshi – Otani Yoshitsugu (1558–1600)
Harima – Arima Harunobu (1567–1612)
Kiyama – Konishi Yukinaga (1555–1600)
Sugiyama – Maeda Toshiie (1539–1599)
Zataki – Matsudaira Sadakatsu (1560–1624)
Toda Mariko – Hosokawa Gracia (1563–1600)
Toda Hiro-matsu "Iron Fist" – Hosokawa Fujitaka (1534–1610)
Toda Buntaro – Hosokawa Tadaoki (1563–1646)
Toda Saruji – Hosokawa Tadatoshi (1586–1641)
Kasigi Yabu – Honda Masanobu (1538–1616)
Kasigi Omi – Honda Masazumi (1566–1637)
Goroda – Oda Nobunaga (1534–1582)
Nakamura – Toyotomi Hideyoshi (1536–1598)
Akechi Jinsai – Akechi Mitsuhide (1528–1582)
Lady Genjiko – Oeyo (1573–1626)
Martin Alvito – João Rodrigues (1561/1562–1633/1634)
Johann Vinck – Jan Joosten van Lodensteijn (1556?–1623)
Spillbergen – Jacob Quaeckernaeck (?–1606)
Father Dell'Aqua – Alessandro Valignano (1539–1606)
Brother Michael – Miguel Chijiwa (1569?–1633)
Captain-General Ferriera – Horatio Neretti, captain of the Black Ship in 1600

Background
Clavell stated that reading a sentence in his daughter's textbook that stated that "in 1600, an Englishman went to Japan and became a samurai" inspired the novel. Shogun was therefore based on an actual series of events involving Adams, who reached Japan in 1600 and became involved with the future shogun Tokugawa. He achieved high status managing commercial activities for Tokugawa's shogunate, though much of the interaction between the various characters in the novel was invented. The first draft was 2,300 pages and Clavell cut it down to 1,700 with the help of his editor, German Gollob.

Themes
The main theme of the novel is the precarious peace of Japan in 1600, a nation consumed by endless civil war and political machinations. The heir to the Taiko, the deceased supreme leader of Japan, is too young to rule, and five daimyōs specifically chosen by the late Taiko for their inability to work together hold power as a Council of Regents until the boy comes of age. The novel details the intense power struggle between the two most powerful daimyōs, Toranaga and Ishido, as they both seek to thwart the other's ambitions. As a subtext, there is also the political manoeuvring of the Protestant and Catholic powers in the Far East. This translates an internal conflict in Japan between Christian daimyōs (who are motivated in part by a desire to preserve and expand their religion) and the daimyōs who oppose the Japanese Christians as followers of foreign beliefs and potential traitors whose loyalty is questionable.

Portugal, which holds the sole right to trade with Japan, and the Catholic Church, mainly through the Order of the Jesuits, have gained a religious, economic, and political foothold and seek to extend their power in Japan (as they have done in nearby places such as Goa and Macao). Guns and other modern military capabilities brought to Japan by the Portuguese, and indirectly by Blackthorne, are still a novelty and coveted by powerful lords looking to gain an advantage over their rivals, but are despised by many samurai as a threat to their traditional methods of fighting. In contrast, however, the silk trade is viewed as essential, and the Portuguese traders regularly amass huge profits via their annual "Black Ship" fleets from Macao.

Japanese society is shown to be very insular and xenophobic, with foreigners referred to as "barbarians" and shunned for their arrogance, eating habits, lack of fluency in the Japanese language, and inability to respect Japanese social customs. As a result, there are many internal conflicts between the "Eastern" and "Western" cultures – especially to do with duty, honor, sexuality, cleanliness, diet, obligations, hierarchies, loyalties, and – more particularly – the essence of 'self'. Blackthorne is also torn between his growing affection for Mariko (who is married to a powerful, abusive, and dangerous samurai, Buntaro), his increasing loyalty to Toranaga, his household and consort, a "Willow world" courtesan named Kiku, and his desire to return to the open seas aboard Erasmus so he can intercept the Black Ship  before it reaches Japan.

A recurring motif in the book is Toranaga engaging in falconry. He compares his various birds to his vassals and mulls over his handling of them, flinging them at targets, giving them morsels, and bringing them back to his fist for re-hooding. There are other recurring themes of Eastern values, as opposed to Western values, masculine (patriarchal) values as opposed to human values, etc. Another is the granting of honours and favours to those who display loyalty - including the trading of secrets by a mama-san called Gyoko, which allows Toranaga to gain an upperhand in his power play for the shogunate.

Reception
"I can't remember when a novel has seized my mind like this one", The New York Timess Webster Schott wrote. He added, "It's almost impossible not to continue to read Shōgun once having opened it".

In addition to becoming a best-seller, with more than six million copies of the novel in 14 hardcover and 38 paperback printings by 1980, Shōgun had great impact on westerners' knowledge of, and interest in, Japanese history and culture. The editor of Learning from Shōgun: Japanese History and Western Fantasy (1980) estimated that 20 to 50% of all students in American college-level courses about Japan had read the novel. He described the book as "a virtual encyclopedia of Japanese history and culture; somewhere among those half-million words, one can find a brief description of virtually everything one wanted to know about Japan", and stated that "In sheer quantity, Shōgun has probably conveyed more information about Japan to more people than all the combined writings of scholars, journalists, and novelists since the Pacific War". The author of James Clavell: A Critical Companion calls the novel "one of the most effective depictions of cross-cultural encounters ever written", and "Clavell's finest effort".

Clavell said that Shōgun "is B.C. and A.D. It made me. I became a brand name, like Heinz Baked Beans". He reported that the ruler of a Middle Eastern petrostate offered him a full oil tanker for a novel that would do for his country what Shōgun did for Japan.

Adaptations

Television
In 1976 Clavell employed Robert Bolt to write a screenplay. The novel was adapted as a nine-hour television miniseries in 1980. It starred Richard Chamberlain, Toshiro Mifune, Yoko Shimada, and John Rhys-Davies. This was edited into a two-hour theatrical release. A 5-disc DVD release appeared in 2003 and a 3-disc Blu-ray release in 2014. 

On August 3, 2018, it was announced that FX would be adapting the novel into a miniseries. Hiroyuki Sanada, Cosmo Jarvis, and Anna Sawai are set to star in the miniseries.

Theatrical
A Broadway musical followed the television production.

Games
There have been three computer games based on the Shōgun novel. Two text-based adventure games with sparse graphics were produced for the Amiga and PC, marketed as James Clavell's Shōgun by Infocom and Shōgun by Mastertronic. A unique graphical adventure game, Shōgun, was also produced for systems including the Commodore 64, Amstrad CPC and IBM PC by Lee & Mathias and released by Virgin Entertainment in 1986.

The tabletop game publisher FASA published James Clavell's Shogun in 1983. This was the third of four boardgame titles based on Clavell novels.

Other fiction depicting the life of Will Adams

Clavell was not the first author to novelise the story of Will Adams; several earlier and less successful attempts exist. The first, by William Dalton, was called Will Adams, The First Englishman in Japan: A Romantic Biography (London, 1861). Dalton had never been to Japan and his book reflects romanticised Victorian British notions of the exotic Asian. Richard Blaker's The Needlewatcher (London, 1932) is the least romantic of the novels; Blaker attempted to de-mythologize Adams and to write a careful historical work of fiction. James Scherer's Pilot and Shōgun is less a novel than a series of incidents in Adams' life. American Robert Lund wrote Daishi-san (New York, 1960) also tackles the subject. In Christopher Nicole's Lord of the Golden Fan, published just two years before Shōgun, in 1973, Adams is portrayed as sexually frustrated by the morals of his time and seeks freedom in the East, where he has numerous sexual encounters. The work is considered light pornography.

References

External links

 Shogun at FactBehindFiction.com

1975 British novels
Historical novels
Asian Saga novels
Books with cover art by Paul Bacon
Japan in non-Japanese culture
Novels set in the 17th century
Novels set in Japan
Novels set in the 1600s
British novels adapted into television shows
British novels adapted into plays
Novels adapted into video games
Sengoku period in fiction
Hodder & Stoughton books